The Danta State was a sovereign state that was established in 1061 and lasted till its merger with the Indian Republic. It was located in what is now Banaskantha District of Gujarat, India.

See also
List of Rajput dynasties and states

References

Banaskantha district
Bombay Presidency
Princely states of Gujarat
11th-century establishments in India
1061 establishments in Asia
1948 disestablishments in India
States and territories established in 1061